Greenfeld is a hamlet in the Canadian province of Saskatchewan. It is located in the rural municipality of Laird No. 404, Saskatchewan.

See also 

 List of communities in Saskatchewan
 Hamlets of Saskatchewan

Footnotes

Unincorporated communities in Saskatchewan
Laird No. 404, Saskatchewan
Division No. 15, Saskatchewan